Kamen Rider 555 is the 2003 incarnation of the Kamen Rider franchise. It ran for 50 episodes, with the 50th episode marked as "FINAL", and was originally broadcast on TV Asahi from January 26, 2003 to January 18, 2004. All 50 episodes were written by Toshiki Inoue. On October 5, 2003 (The day that episode 36 aired) the show used TV Asahi's current logo.

Episodes

See also

555
Lists of Japanese television series episodes